The East Gippsland Football League is an Australian rules football League in the East Gippsland region of Victoria, Australia.

History
The East Gippsland FL in its present incarnation began in 1974 with the merger of the Gippsland Football League and the Bairnsdale District Football League.  The league has had a number of clubs fold, merge, leave and return over its history, due partly to changing economic circumstances in the area, with areas such as Orbost losing large amounts of their population.

At one stage in the 1980s, the league divided its clubs into two divisions, due to a desire to avoid weekly 40-goal drubbings for the weaker clubs. In 1984 the league had two divisions of five clubs each, both divisions having a club with a bye every week, this move enabling the league to save costs on umpiring.

However, in 1985 Wy Yung got promoted to first division, so the league then had six and four. The second division broke away in 1986 to form the Riviera Football League, together with some clubs who had left the North Gippsland Football League.  After the Riviera FL disbanded in 2004, Paynesville was the only East Gippsland member club to return to the EGFL, with West Bairnsdale having folded in the interim, and Lindenow South and Swan Reach instead opting to join the Omeo & District Football League.

In 2011, the league dropped back to six clubs, with Bairnsdale returning to the Gippsland Football League.  In 2012 season the league grew to again feature 7 clubs, with Stratford announcing that they would leave the North Gippsland Football League and join the EGFL.  Boisdale-Briagolong followed suit in 2015, bringing the league to eight clubs.

Timeline

Clubs

Current

Previous

Leading Goal Kickers

2011 Ladder

2012 Ladder

2013 Ladder

2014 Ladder

2015 Ladder

2016 Ladder

References

External links
East Gippsland Football League
 Full Points Footy -East Gippsland Football League

Australian rules football competitions in Victoria (Australia)
East Gippsland